

Events

Pre-1600
 627 – Battle of Nineveh: A Byzantine army under Emperor Heraclius defeats Emperor Khosrau II's Persian forces, commanded by General Rhahzadh.
1388 – Maria of Enghien sells the lordship of Argos and Nauplia to the Republic of Venice.

1601–1900
1787 – Pennsylvania becomes the second state to ratify the US Constitution.
1862 – American Civil War:  sinks on the Yazoo River.
1866 – Oaks explosion: The worst mining disaster in England kills 361 miners and rescuers.
1870 – Joseph H. Rainey of South Carolina becomes the second black U.S. congressman.

1901–present
1901 – Guglielmo Marconi receives the first transatlantic radio signal (the letter "S" [•••] in Morse Code), at Signal Hill in St John's, Newfoundland.
1915 – Yuan Shikai declares the establishment of the Empire of China and proclaims himself Emperor.
1917 – Father Edward J. Flanagan founds Boys Town as a farm village for wayward boys.
1935 – Lebensborn Project, a Nazi reproduction program, is founded by Heinrich Himmler.
1937 – Second Sino-Japanese War: USS Panay incident: Japanese aircraft bomb and sink U.S. gunboat  on the Yangtze river in China.
  1939   – Winter War: The Battle of Tolvajärvi, also known as the first major Finnish victory in the Winter War, begins.
1941 – World War II: Fifty-four Japanese A6M Zero fighters raid Batangas Field, Philippines. Jesús Villamor and four Filipino fighter pilots fend them off; César Basa is killed.
  1941   – The Holocaust: Adolf Hitler declares the imminent extermination of the Jews at a meeting in the Reich Chancellery.
1945 – The People's Republic of Korea is outlawed in the South, by order of the United States Army Military Government in Korea.
1946 – United Nations Security Council Resolution 13 relating to acceptance of Siam (now Thailand) to the United Nations is adopted.
1956 – United Nations Security Council Resolution 121 relating to acceptance of Japan to the United Nations is adopted.
1963 – Kenya declares independence from Great Britain.
1969 – The Piazza Fontana bombing; a bomb explodes at the headquarters of Banca Nazionale dell'Agricoltura (the National Agricultural Bank) in Piazza Fontana in Milan, Italy, killing 17 people and wounding 88. The same afternoon, three more bombs are detonated in Rome and Milan, and another is found unexploded.
1979 – The 8.2  Tumaco earthquake shakes Colombia and Ecuador with a maximum Mercalli intensity of IX (Violent), killing 300–600, and generating a large tsunami.
1979 – Coup d'état of December Twelfth occurs in South Korea.
1985 – Arrow Air Flight 1285R, a McDonnell Douglas DC-8, crashes after takeoff in Gander, Newfoundland, killing all 256 people on board, including 236 members of the United States Army's 101st Airborne Division.
1988 – The Clapham Junction rail crash kills thirty-five and injures hundreds after two collisions of three commuter trains—one of the worst train crashes in the United Kingdom.
1999 – A magnitude 7.3 earthquake hits the Philippines's main island of Luzon, killing six people, injuring 40, and causing power outages that affected the capital Manila.
2000 – The United States Supreme Court releases its decision in Bush v. Gore.
2001 – Prime Minister of Vietnam Phan Văn Khải announces the decision on upgrading the Phong Nha–Kẻ Bàng nature reserve to a national park, providing information on projects for the conservation and development of the park and revised maps.
2012 – North Korea successfully launches its first satellite, Kwangmyŏngsŏng-3 Unit 2.
2015 – The Paris Agreement relating to United Nations Framework Convention on Climate Change is adopted.
2021 – Dutch Formula One racing driver Max Verstappen wins the controversial 2021 Abu Dhabi Grand Prix, beating seven-time World Champion Lewis Hamilton to become the first Formula One World Champion to come from the Netherlands.

Births

Pre-1600

1526 – Álvaro de Bazán, 1st Marquis of Santa Cruz, Spanish admiral (d. 1588)

1601–1900
1685 – Lodovico Giustini, Italian pianist and composer (d. 1743)
1724 – Samuel Hood, 1st Viscount Hood, English admiral and politician (d. 1816)
1786 – William L. Marcy, American lawyer, judge, and politician, 21st United States Secretary of State (d. 1857)
1799 – Karl Bryullov, Russian painter (d. 1852) 
1805 – Henry Wells, American businessman, co-founded Wells Fargo and American Express (d. 1878)
1806 – Stand Watie, American general (d. 1871)
1812 – John Sandfield Macdonald, Canadian lawyer and politician, 1st Premier of Ontario (d. 1872)
1821 – Gustave Flaubert, French novelist (d. 1880)
1830 – Joseph Orville Shelby, Confederate general (d. 1897)
1842 – Adolf Bötticher, German journalist and historian (d. 1901)
1845 – Bruce Price, American architect, designed the American Surety Building and Bank of the Metropolis (d. 1903)
1863 – Edvard Munch, Norwegian painter
1866 – Alfred Werner, Swiss chemist and academic, Nobel Prize laureate (d. 1919)
1870 – Walter Benona Sharp, American businessman, co-founded Hughes Tool Company (d. 1912)
1876 – Alvin Kraenzlein, American hurdler and runner (d. 1928)
1881 – Louise Thuliez, French school teacher, resistance fighter during World War I and World War II and author (d. 1966)
1893 – Edward G. Robinson, American actor (d. 1973)

1901–present
1901 – Harald Kaarmann, Estonian footballer (d. 1942)
1907 – Roy Douglas, English pianist and composer (d. 2015)
1912 – Henry Armstrong, American boxer (d. 1988)
1915 – Frank Sinatra, American singer, actor, and producer (d. 1998)
1918 – Joe Williams, American singer and pianist (d. 1999)
1920 – Josef Doležal, Czech race walker (d. 1999)
1923 – Bob Barker, American game show host and producer
  1923   – Bob Dorough, American musician, composer, and producer (d. 2018)
1924 – Ed Koch, American politician, 105th Mayor of New York City (d. 2013)
1925 – Ted Kennedy, Canadian ice hockey player (d. 2009)
  1925   – Dattu Phadkar, Indian cricketer (d. 1985)
  1925   – Vladimir Shainsky, Ukrainian-Russian pianist and composer (d. 2017)
1927 – Robert Noyce, American inventor and businessman, co-founded the Intel Corporation (d. 1990)
1928 – Helen Frankenthaler, American painter and academic (d. 2011)
1929 – Toshiko Akiyoshi, Japanese pianist and composer
1932 – Bob Pettit, American basketball player and coach
1933 – Christa Stubnick, German sprinter (d. 2021)
1934 – Miguel de la Madrid, Mexican lawyer and politician, 52nd President of Mexico (d. 2012)
1936 – Iolanda Balaș, Romanian high jumper and educator (d. 2016)
1937 – Philip Ledger, English pianist, composer, and academic (d. 2012)
1940 – Sharad Pawar, Indian politician, Indian Minister of Agriculture
  1940   – Dionne Warwick, American singer
1943 – Grover Washington, Jr., American singer-songwriter, saxophonist, and producer (d. 1999)
1945 – Tony Williams, American drummer, composer, and producer (d. 1997)
1946 – Emerson Fittipaldi, Brazilian racing driver
1947 – Chris Mullin, English journalist and politician
1948 – Colin Todd, English football player and coach
1949 – Bill Nighy, English actor
  1949   – Marc Ravalomanana, Malagasy businessman and politician, President of Madagascar
1950 – Pedro Ferriz de Con, Mexican journalist
  1950   – Heiner Flassbeck, German economist and academic
  1950   – Gorman Thomas, American baseball player
  1950   – Rajinikanth, Indian actor
  1950   – Billy Smith, Canadian ice hockey player, coach, and manager
1951 – Rehman Malik, Pakistani politician, Pakistani Minister of Interior
1952 – Cathy Rigby, American gymnast
1953 – Martin Ferguson, Australian lawyer and politician
  1953   – Rafael Septién, Mexican-American football player
1955 – Eddy Schepers, Belgian cyclist
1956 – Johan van der Velde, Dutch cyclist
1960 – Martina Hellmann, German discus thrower
1961 – Andrey Perlov, Russian race walker
1962 – Tracy Austin, American tennis player and sportscaster
  1962   – Arturo Barrios, Mexican-American runner
  1962   – Mike Golic, American football player and radio host
1963 – Eduardo Castro Luque, Mexican businessman and politician (d. 2012)
1964 – Haywood Jeffires, American football player and coach
1967 – John Randle, American football player
1968 – Sašo Udovič, Slovenian footballer
1969 – Wilfred Kirochi, Kenyan runner
  1969   – Fiona May, English-Italian long jumper
  1969   – Michael Möllenbeck, German discus thrower
1970 – Jennifer Connelly, American actress
  1970   – Regina Hall, American actress
1971 – Sammy Korir, Kenyan runner
1972 – Nicky Eaden, English footballer and coach
  1972   – Craig Field, Australian rugby league player
  1972   – Wilson Kipketer, Kenyan-Danish runner
  1972   – Georgios Theodoridis, Greek sprinter
1974 – Bernard Lagat, Kenyan-American runner
  1974   – Nolberto Solano, Peruvian footballer and manager
1975 – Mayim Bialik, American actress, neuroscientist, and author
1975 – Craig Moore, Australian footballer and manager
1977 – Yoel Hernández, Cuban hurdler
  1977   – Dean Macey, English decathlete and bobsledder
  1977   – Colin White, Canadian ice hockey player
1979 – Nate Clements, American football player
  1979   – John Salmons, American basketball player
1980 – Dejene Berhanu, Ethiopian runner (d. 2010)
  1980   – Dorin Goian, Romanian footballer
1981 – Pedro Ríos, Spanish footballer
  1981   – Yuvraj Singh, Indian cricketer
  1981   – Stephen Warnock, English footballer
1982 – Dmitry Tursunov, Russian tennis player and coach
1983 – Roni Porokara, Finnish footballer
1984 – Daniel Agger, Danish footballer
1985 – Pat Calathes, Greek-American basketball player
1986 – Daddy Birori, Rwandan footballer
  1986   – Përparim Hetemaj, Finnish footballer
  1986   – Nina Kolarič, Slovenian long jumper
  1986   – T. J. Ward, American football player
1988 – Isaac John, New Zealand rugby league player
1990 – Nixon Chepseba, Kenyan runner
  1990   – Dawin, American singer-songwriter
1991 – Joseph Leilua, Australian-Samoan rugby league player
1993 – Zeli Ismail, English footballer
1994 – Otto Warmbier, American student imprisoned in North Korea (d. 2017)
1996 – Lucas Hedges, American actor

Deaths

Pre-1600
 884 – King Carloman II of the Franks (born c.866; hunting accident)
1296 – Isabella of Mar, first wife of Robert Bruce VII (b. 1277)
1572 – Loredana Marcello, Dogaressa of Venice, botanist, author

1601–1900
1751 – Henry St John, 1st Viscount Bolingbroke, English philosopher and politician, Secretary at War (b. 1678)
1766 – Johann Christoph Gottsched, German philosopher, author, and critic (b. 1700)
1794 – Meshullam Feivush Heller, Ukrainian author (b. 1742)
1803 – Prince Frederick Adolf of Sweden (b. 1750)
1858 – Jacques Viger, Canadian archeologist and politician, 1st Mayor of Montreal (b. 1787)
  1889   – Viktor Bunyakovsky, Ukrainian-Russian mathematician and theorist (b. 1804)
1894 – John Sparrow David Thompson, Canadian lawyer, judge, and politician, 4th Prime Minister of Canada (b. 1845)

1901–present
1913 – Menelik II, Ethiopian emperor (b. 1844)
1921 – Henrietta Swan Leavitt, American astronomer and academic (b. 1868)
1923 – Raymond Radiguet, French author and poet (b. 1903)
1934 – Thorleif Haug, Norwegian skier (b. 1894)
1939 – Douglas Fairbanks, Sr., American actor, producer, and screenwriter (b. 1883)
1941 – César Basa, Filipino lieutenant and pilot (b. 1915)
1951 – Mildred Bailey, American singer (b. 1907)
1958 – Albert Walsh, Canadian lawyer and politician, 1st Lieutenant Governor of Newfoundland (b. 1900)
1966 – Karl Ruberl, Austrian-American swimmer (b. 1880)
1968 – Tallulah Bankhead, American actress (b. 1902)
1970 – Doris Blackburn, Australian politician (b. 1889)
1975 – Richard Baggallay, English colonel and cricketer (b. 1884)
1980 – Jean Lesage, Canadian lawyer and politician, 19th Premier of Quebec (b. 1912)
1985 – Anne Baxter, American actress (b. 1923)
1993 – József Antall, Hungarian historian and politician, 35th Prime Minister of Hungary (b. 1932)
1994 – Stuart Roosa, American colonel, pilot, and astronaut (b. 1933)
1996 – Vance Packard, American journalist, author, and critic (b. 1914)
1997 – Evgenii Landis, Ukrainian-Russian mathematician and academic (b. 1921)
1998 – Lawton Chiles, American soldier, lawyer, and politician, 41st Governor of Florida (b. 1930)
  1998   – Morris Udall, American captain and politician (b. 1922)
1999 – Paul Cadmus, American painter and illustrator (b. 1904)
  1999   – Joseph Heller, American novelist, short story writer, and playwright(b. 1923)
2001 – Ardito Desio, Italian geologist and explorer (b. 1897)
2002 – Dee Brown, American historian and author (b. 1908)
2003 – Heydar Aliyev, Azerbaijani general and politician, 3rd President of Azerbaijan (b. 1923)
2005 – Robert Newmyer, American actor and producer (b. 1956)
  2005   – Annette Stroyberg, Danish actress (b. 1936)
  2005   – Gebran Tueni, Lebanese journalist and politician (b. 1957)
2006 – Paul Arizin, American basketball player (b. 1928)
  2006   – Peter Boyle, American actor (b. 1935)
  2006   – Alan Shugart, American engineer and businessman, co-founded Seagate Technology (b. 1930)
2007 – François al-Hajj, Lebanese general (b. 1953)
  2007   – Ike Turner, American singer-songwriter, guitarist, and producer (b. 1931)
2008 – Avery Dulles, American cardinal and theologian (b. 1918)
  2008   – Van Johnson, American actor (b. 1916)
2010 – Tom Walkinshaw, Scottish race car driver, founded Tom Walkinshaw Racing (b. 1946)
2012 – Joe Allbritton, American banker, publisher, and philanthropist, founded the Allbritton Communications Company (b. 1924)
  2012   – David Tait, English rugby player (b. 1987)
2013 – Tom Laughlin, American actor, director, screenwriter, author, educator, and activist (b. 1931)
  2013   – Abdul Quader Molla, Bangladeshi journalist and politician (b. 1948)
  2013   – Audrey Totter, American actress (b. 1917)
2014 – Norman Bridwell, American author and illustrator, created Clifford the Big Red Dog (b. 1928)
  2014   – Ivor Grattan-Guinness, English mathematician, historian, and academic (b. 1941)
  2014   – Herb Plews, American baseball player (b. 1928)
2015 – Frans Geurtsen, Dutch footballer (b. 1942)
  2015   – Evelyn S. Lieberman, American politician, White House Deputy Chief of Staff (b. 1944)
2016 – Shirley Hazzard, Australian-American novelist, short story writer, and essayist (b. 1931)
2017 – Ed Lee, American politician and attorney, 43rd Mayor of San Francisco (b. 1952)
  2017   – Pat DiNizio, American singer and songwriter  (b. 1955)
2019 – Danny Aiello, American actor (b. 1933)
2020 – John le Carré, English author (b. 1931)
  2020   – Ann Reinking, American actress, dancer, and choreographer (b. 1949)
2021 – Maʻafu Tukuiʻaulahi, Tongan politician and military officer, Deputy Prime Minister (b. 1955)

Holidays and observances
 Christian feast day:
 Abra of Poitiers
 Columba of Terryglass
 Corentin of Quimper
 Edburga of Minster-in-Thanet
 Feast of Our Lady of Guadalupe
 Finnian of Clonard
 Vicelinus
 Constitution Day (Russia)
 Neutrality Day (Turkmenistan)

References

External links

 BBC: On This Day
 
 Historical Events on December 12

Days of the year
December